The L.B. Overby House, located at 317 S. Jefferson St. in Princeton, Kentucky, was built in 1857.  It was listed on the National Register of Historic Places in 1990.

The listing included three contributing buildings and a contributing site.

References

Houses on the National Register of Historic Places in Kentucky
Greek Revival architecture in Kentucky
Houses completed in 1857
Houses in Caldwell County, Kentucky
1857 establishments in Kentucky
National Register of Historic Places in Caldwell County, Kentucky
Princeton, Kentucky